The Fruit Tree Planting Foundation (FTPF) is a Pittsburgh-based nonprofit with a branch on the big island of Hawaii and charitable programs around the world. FTPF is an international nonprofit charity dedicated to planting fruit trees to alleviate world hunger, combat climate change, strengthen communities, and improve the surrounding air, soil, and water. FTPF programs strategically donate orchards where the harvest will best serve communities for generations, at places such as public schools, city parks, community gardens, low-income neighborhoods, Native American reservations, international hunger relief sites, and animal sanctuaries. FTPF’s unique mission benefits the environment, human health, and animal welfare—all at once. FTPF was founded by David (Avocado) Wolfe.  FTPF's visionary founder and president, David Wolfe, and its co-creator and TreeEO, Cem Akin, envision a healthy planet where fruit trees provide ecosystems with fresh air, rich soil, and sustainable nutrition.

See also
Food security
Garden city movement
Urban reforestation

References

External links
 The Fruit Tree Planting Foundation

Nature conservation organizations based in the United States
Environmental organizations based in Pennsylvania
Non-profit organizations based in Pittsburgh
Sustainability organizations
Urban forestry organizations